New Garden Airport , also known as New Garden Flying Field, is a public airport located in Toughkenamon, Chester County, Pennsylvania (about  southwest of Philadelphia).

The airport serves a large general aviation community, and offers maintenance facilities, aviation fuel (100LL), flight instruction, aircraft rental and hangar/tie-down space. The airport also hosts the Brandywine Soaring Association and Chapter 240 of the Experimental Aircraft Association (EAA). Additionally, in 2015, the airport began hosting the annual Chester County Balloon Festival; a non-profit event with the proceeds going to the Chester County Hero Fund and several other local community groups. This hot air balloon festival is designed for families and kids of all ages featuring more than 20 balloons, including Special Shape Balloons.  Jonathan Martin is the Aviation Director.

On August 31, 2022, the airport was the site of the New Garden Air & Car Show. The event was re-scheduled from August 30, 2022, due to inclement whether.

Facilities 
 Runway 6/24: 3,695 x 50 ft (1,126 x 15 m), Surface: Asphalt

References 
New Garden Airport (official site)
Pennsylvania Bureau of Aviation: New Garden Flying Field (N57)

List of in-line citations

External links 

 New Garden Flight Connection (on location ground and flight school)

Airports in Pennsylvania
Transportation buildings and structures in Chester County, Pennsylvania